Two Colours or Two Colors may refer to:

 Two Colors, a 1989 album by Kvitka Cisyk, and its title track
 Two Colours (EP), by Feeder, 1995
 Twocolors, a German electronic music duo

See also
 Bicolor (disambiguation)
 Two-color system of projection